
Gmina Czarna is a rural gmina (administrative district) in Bieszczady County, Subcarpathian Voivodeship, in south-eastern Poland, on the border with Ukraine.

The gmina contains part of the protected area called San Valley Landscape Park.

Villages
Gmina Czarna contains the villages and settlements of Bystre, Chrewt, Czarna, Czarna Dolna, Lipie, Michniowiec, Olchowiec, Paniszczów, Polana, Rabe, Rosochate, Rosolin, Serednie Małe, Sokołowa Wola, Tworylne, Wydrne and Żłobek.

Neighbouring gminas
Gmina Czarna is bordered by the gminas of Cisna, Lutowiska, Solina and Ustrzyki Dolne. It also borders Ukraine.

References
Polish official population figures 2006

Czarna
Gmina Czarna